Louis H. Jackson (1904–1960) was a British film producer. He oversaw production at British National Films during the 1940s.

Selected filmography
 Waltz Time (1945)
 Twilight Hour (1945)
 Loyal Heart (1946)
 The Trojan Brothers (1946)
 The Laughing Lady (1946)
 Green Fingers (1947)
 Woman to Woman (1947)

References

Bibliography
 Harper, Sue. Women in British Cinema: Mad, Bad and Dangerous to Know. A&C Black, 2000.

External links

1904 births
1960 deaths
Film producers from London